Canadian Mounted Rifles was part of the designation of several mounted infantry units in Canada in the late 19th and early 20th centuries.

Units of the Permanent Active Militia

Units formed for the Second Boer War

Independent squadrons of the Non-Permanent Active Militia

Units of the Canadian Expeditionary Force of the First World War

See also 

 List of mounted regiments in the Canadian Expeditionary Force
List of infantry battalions in the Canadian Expeditionary Force
Mounted Infantry
Canadian Militia 
History of the Canadian Army
Permanent Active Militia 
Non-Permanent Active Militia
Military history of Canada during World War I 
 Australian Light Horse 
 Imperial Yeomanry 
 Otter Commission

References

External links 

 https://www.canada.ca/en/department-national-defence/services/military-history/history-heritage/official-military-history-lineages/lineages.html
https://www.canada.ca/en/department-national-defence/services/military-history/history-heritage/official-military-history-lineages/lineages/amalgamated-units.html
 https://www.canada.ca/en/department-national-defence/services/military-history/history-heritage/official-military-history-lineages/lineages/regiments-perpetuations.html

Mounted rifle regiments of Canada